Harith Haiqal bin Adam Afkar (born 22 June 2002) is a Malaysian professional footballer who plays as a defender for Malaysia Super League club Selangor.

Early life 
Harith start beginning of his careef football with been spotted by the NFDP officials while he was playing for his school's under-12 before joining the Mokhtar Dahari Academy (AMD). He was a striker at the beginning of his football journey, but his talent in handling the defense line as a central defender started with the AMD team and shines in that position up until now.

Club career

Selangor

Harith became one of the AMD players who signed his first professional contract with Selangor after graduating from high school. He then managed to be listed with the Selangor II team after displaying an impressive performance during the three cornered match against the other young Red Giants player handled by coach, Michael Feichtenbeiner at the end of 2019. On 31 July 2021, he made his debut for the first team in the Super League matches against Penang; which he came on as substitute. 

On 25 November 2021, Selangor confirmed that Harith would be definitely promoted to Selangor's first team for 2022 season.

International career
Harith was part of the 2018 AFC U-16 Championship squad. Also, he been selected for national under-23 to represent 2022 AFC U-23 Asian Cup qualification and help the squad to reach the final tournament.

Career statistics

Club

References

External links
 

Malaysian footballers
Malaysia international footballers
Malaysia Premier League players
Malaysia Super League players
Selangor FA players
Living people
2002 births
Association football goalkeepers
People from Selangor
Malaysian people of Malay descent
Competitors at the 2021 Southeast Asian Games
Southeast Asian Games competitors for Malaysia